The Daughters of Mary, Health of the Sick was a Roman Catholic religious institute for women. The order was founded in 1935 by Rev. Edward F. Garesche SJ with authorization of the Archbishop of New York, Cardinal Patrick Joseph Hayes.

Their motherhouse, Vista Maria, was established in 1936 in Cragsmoor, New York. In 1953, a foreign mission was founded in Okinawa. The sisters devoted their time to caring for the sick and needy through medical ministry, as well as religious instruction. In 1976 the order disbanded. Some members joined other religious orders, including the Sisters of Charity of New York.

References

Religious organizations disestablished in 1976
Women's organizations based in the United States
Catholic female orders and societies
Christian organizations established in 1935
1935 establishments in New York (state)
1976 disestablishments in New York (state)